Kill Me Please is a 2015 teen thriller drama film written and directed by Anita Rocha da Silveira in her directorial debut. It premiered in the Horizons section of the 72nd Venice International Film Festival, and was later awarded for best director and best actress (Valentina Herszage) at the 2015 Rio de Janeiro International Film Festival.

Premise
A wave of murderers plague the Barra da Tijuca neighborhood of Rio de Janeiro. What starts off as a morbid curiosity for the local youth slowly begins to spoil away at their lives. Among them is Bia, a 15-year-old girl. After an encounter with death, she will do anything to ensure she is alive.

Cast
 Valentina Herszage as Bia
 Dora Freind as Renata
 Mari Oliveira as Mariana
 Júlia Roliz as Michele
 Rita Pauls as dead girl
 Laryssa Ayres	as Amanda
 Vicente Conde	as Bernardo
 Bernardo Marinho as João
 Antara Morri as Nicole

References

External links
 

2015 films
2015 directorial debut films
2015 thriller drama films
2010s teen drama films
Argentine thriller drama films
Brazilian thriller drama films
Films set in Rio de Janeiro (city)
Films shot in Rio de Janeiro (city)
Teen thriller films
2010s Portuguese-language films
2010s Argentine films